Christine Ferea is an American bare-knuckle boxer who competes in the flyweight division of the Bare Knuckle Fighting Championship (BKFC), where she is the current BKFC Flyweight Champion.

Background 
Ferea was born in San Jose, California, United States. Growing up as a troubled kid, she fought in many street fights. She signed up at a gym in the hope to get fit, and after she was humbled by many fighters there, she started Muay Thai training. She found her way to BKFC in 2018, where she is currently the #1 ranked woman in the world at 125lbs. Ferea's moniker "Misfit", is tattooed on her left shin.

Bare Knuckle Fighting Championship 
On February 20, 2022, Ferea defeated Britain Hart to win the inaugural BKFC women’s flyweight title in the rematch at BKFC: KnuckleMania 2.

Mixed martial arts career

Early career 
Ferea amassed a record of 13–0 in amateur Muay Thai, and 1-0 professionally. She later transitioned to MMA.

Ferea amassed a record of 3–0 in amateur mixed martial arts career from 2012 to 2015, fighting under King of the Cage (KOTC), Tuff-N-Uff, and Dragon House, prior to being signed by Invicta.

Invicta Fighting Championships 
Ferea made her Invicta debut on January 14, 2017, against Rachael Ostovich at Invicta FC 21: Anderson vs. Tweet. She won the fight via technical knock-out on round three.

Her next fight came on May 20, 2017, facing Tiffany van Soest at Invicta FC 23: Porto vs. Niedźwiedź. She lost the fight via unanimous decision.

On December 8, 2017, Ferea faced Karina Rodríguez at Invicta FC 26: Maia vs. Niedwiedz. She lost the fight via unanimous decision.

Championships and accomplishments

Bare-knuckle boxing
Bare Knuckle Fighting Championship
BKFC Women's Flyweight Championship (two times; current; first)

Mixed martial arts record 

|-
| Loss
| align=center| 1–2
| Karina Rodríguez
| Decision (unanimous)
| Invicta FC 26: Maia vs. Niedwiedz
| 
| align=center| 3
| align=center| 5:00
| Kansas City, Missouri, United States
|
|-
| Loss
| align=center| 1–1
| Tiffany van Soest
| Decision (unanimous)
| Invicta FC 23: Porto vs. Niedźwiedź
| 
| align=center| 3
| align=center| 5:00
| Kansas City, Missouri, United States
|
|-
| Win
| align=center| 1–0
| Rachael Ostovich
| TKO (head kick and punches)
| Invicta FC 21: Anderson vs. Tweet
| 
| align=center| 3
| align=center| 1:29
| Kansas City, Missouri, United States
|
|-

Bare knuckle boxing record

|-
|Win
|align=center|6–1
|Taylor Starling	
|TKO (retirement)
|BKFC 28: Albuquerque
|
|align=center|1
|align=center|0:47
|Rio Rancho, New Mexico, United States
|
|-
|Win
|align=center|5–1
|Britain Hart	
|Decision (unanimous)
|BKFC: KnuckleMania 2
|
|align=center|5
|align=center|2:00
|Hollywood, Florida, United States
|
|-
|Win
|align=center|4–1
|Calista Silgado	
|KO (punches)
|BKFC Fight Night: Montana
|
|align=center|3
|align=center|1:34
|Billings, Montana, United States
|
|-
|Win
|align=center|3–1
|Calie Cutler 
|TKO (strikes)
|BKFC 12: Alves vs. Lane
|
|align=center|2
|align=center|1:27
|Daytona Beach, Florida, United States
|
|-
|Loss
|align=center|2-1
|Helen Peralta
|Decision (unanimous)
|BKFC 7: Alers vs. Garcia
|
|align=center|5
|align=center|2:00
|Biloxi, Mississippi, United States 
|
|-
|Win
|align=center|2–0
|Britain Hart 
|TKO (doctor stoppage)
|BKFC 5: Lobov vs. Knight
|
|align=center|2
|align=center|1:09
|Biloxi, Mississippi, United States
|
|- 
|Win
|align=center|1-0
|Jennifer Tate
|TKO (punches)
|BKFC 3: The Takeover
|
|align=center|1
|align=center|1:55
|Biloxi, Mississippi, United States
|

See also 
 List of current Invicta FC fighters

References

External links 
 BKFC Rankings Knucklepedia at CombatInsiders.com
 
 Christine Ferea at Invicta FC (archived)

Living people
1982 births
Sportspeople from Las Vegas
American female mixed martial artists
Flyweight mixed martial artists
Mixed martial artists utilizing Muay Thai
Mixed martial artists utilizing Brazilian jiu-jitsu
American Muay Thai practitioners
Female Muay Thai practitioners
American women boxers
Bare-knuckle boxers
American practitioners of Brazilian jiu-jitsu
Female Brazilian jiu-jitsu practitioners
LGBT mixed martial artists
LGBT Muay Thai practitioners
LGBT boxers
LGBT Brazilian jiu-jitsu practitioners
21st-century American women